Nigilgia cuprea is a moth in the family Brachodidae. It was described by Kallies in 1998. It is found in northern Borneo.

References

Natural History Museum Lepidoptera generic names catalog

Brachodidae
Moths described in 1998